Nguyễn Phan Long (1888 – 16 July 1960) served as Prime Minister of the State of Vietnam in January 1950. He was dismissed in May 1950 by the Emperor Bảo Đại under pressure from the French colonial authorities, who resented his pro-American and nationalist attitude.

Journalist at La Tribune Indigène, he founded in 1920 the liberal newspaper L'Écho Annamite, in which wrote e.g. the (Eurasian) Vietnamese nationalist Eugène Dejean de la Bâtie, friend of André Malraux.

He was in the 1920s-1930s the deputy leader of the Parti Constitutionnaliste Indochinois, a nationalist party founded in 1923 and led by Bui Quang Chiêu. He was elected as colonial councillor.

He wrote abundantly about spiritism in his newspaper and was also a fervent adept of Caodaism. He was elected in 1936 as president of the Congrès Universel des Sectes Caodaïques, an attempted unified caodai movement, which eventually failed.

After 1945, he was Minister of Foreign Affairs and Minister of Interior as well as editor of L'Écho du Vietnam.

Sources

see also:
R. B. Smith, "Bui Quang Chiêu and the Constitutionalist Party in French Cochinchina, 1917–30", Modern Asian Studies (1969), 3:131-150 Cambridge University Press
Micheline R. Lessard, "Organisons-nous! Racial Antagonism and Vietnamese Economic Nationalism in the Early Twentieth Century", French Colonial History – Volume 8, 2007, pp. 171–201
Christopher E. Goscha, "Widening the Colonial Encounter: Asian Connections Inside French Indochina During the Interwar Period", Modern Asian Studies (Published online by Cambridge University Press) 16 Oct 2008 (abstract)

1880s births
1960 deaths
Prime Ministers of South Vietnam